Guldbrandsen (literally the Son of the golden sword) is a common Norwegian surname. Two singers share this surname:

Christine Guldbrandsen (born 1985), Norwegian singer
Kate Guldbrandsen (born 1965), Norwegian singer
Peer Guldbrandsen (1912-1996), Danish screenwriter
Valborg Guldbrandsen (1872–1949), Danish ballet dancer

See also
Gulbransen
Gulbrandsen

Danish-language surnames
Norwegian-language surnames